Miyun Town is a town in Miyun District, Beijing, China. Situated near the Bai River, It borders Xiwengzhuang Town to its north, Tanying Ethnic Township and Gulou Subdistrict to its east, Guoyuan Subdistrict and Shilipu Town to its south, and Xitiangezhuang Town to its west. In 2020, the census counted 20,392 residents for this town.

The name Miyun is referring to the collection of tall mountains located at the south of the town, where clouds can be seen gathering around the mountain tops.

History

Subdivisions
As of 2021, Miyun Town is made up of 6 villages:

See also
List of township-level divisions of Beijing
Gulou Subdistrict, the district seat of Miyun District

References 

Towns in Beijing
Miyun District